Aldair Basto Chacón (born October 17, 1990) is a Mexican professional footballer who plays for Venados.

External links
 

1990 births
Living people
Sportspeople from Mérida, Yucatán
Footballers from Yucatán
C.F. Mérida footballers
Venados F.C. players
Association football midfielders
Mexican footballers